This is a list of area codes in Connecticut:

 203 – Covering southwestern Connecticut (Fairfield County (except for Sherman); New Haven County, and the towns of Bethlehem, Woodbury, as well as a small part of Roxbury in Litchfield County); one of the original area codes enacted in 1947
 475 – Overlay of 203 (December 2009)
 860 – Northern and southeastern Connecticut (split from 203 in August 1995)
 959 – Overlay of 860 (August 2014)

In 1999, Connecticut announced that two additional codes may be implemented when needed: 475, overlaying 203; and 959, overlaying 860. In March 2009, NANPA announced area code 475 to overlay 203 in December 2009. Effective November 14, 2009, all calls originating from area code 203 or 860 must be dialed with 10 digits beginning with the area code, including calls within the same area code, with long distance and 976 calls requiring to dial 1 first.

References 

 
Connecticut
Area codes